During the 2009–10 English football season, Leyton Orient F.C. competed in Football League One.

League table

Competitions

League One

Results

Football League Cup

As with all League One sides, Leyton Orient F.C. entered the Football League Cup in the First Round.

Football League Trophy

FA Cup

As Leyton Orient were playing in League One, they entered the FA Cup in the First Round Proper.

References

Notes

Leyton Orient F.C. seasons
Leyton Orient F.C.